Ciaran Anne Magdalene Madden (born 27 December 1942) is a retired English stage, film, and television actress, who was professionally active from the late 1960s through the late 1990s.

She is a graduate of the Royal Academy of Dramatic Arts (RADA), and is an Associate Member of the academy.

Madden is best known internationally for her multiple leading Agatha Christie, Shakespeare, and Tom Stoppard roles filmed for television, and for her dramatic performance as Marianne Dashwood in the 1971 BBC miniseries adaption of Jane Austen's Sense and Sensibility. She appeared in more than 30 television series, teleplays, made-for-television movies, and television miniseries, including a starring performance in the miniseries A Married Man (1984) opposite Anthony Hopkins. She also had major roles in five feature films, including Gawain and the Green Knight (1973), the cult horror film The Beast Must Die (1974), Spy Story (1976) and Swing Kids (1993).

She had originally trained at the Ruskin School of Art at the University of Oxford prior to enrolling at RADA. In the late 1990s she gave up acting and returned to painting, focusing on portraits, and received a diploma from the Heatherley School of Fine Art in London. In 2001 she moved to Dorset with her second husband, Christian Tyler, whom she had married in 1987. Her previous husband, whom she had married in 1972, was John Patrick Scrivenor; they had a son born in late 1972.

Filmography

Film

Television

References

External links

Selected stage credits
Filmography images

British actresses
British film actresses
British stage actresses
British television actresses
Alumni of RADA
British Shakespearean actresses
Alumni of the Ruskin School of Art
Living people
1942 births